Dic Siôn Dafydd is a satirical stereotype caricature of a Welsh person who deliberately turns their back on their nation, its culture and its language.

History and symbolism 
Jac Jones, also known as Jac Glan-y-gors, created a satirical portrait of 'Dic Siôn Dafydd' as a stereotypical Welshman who has consciously decided to forget his roots and turn his back on his nation, culture and language, influenced by a will to succeed in England. The 18th-century ballad describes Dic Siôn Dafydd as a pompous character that has grown up speaking Welsh but insists on speaking English even to his own Welsh-speaking mother.

Dic Siôn Dafydd is also known to be used as an insult that has political connotations, referring to someone from Wales who betrays their nation for their own financial or political gain, or simply having turned their back on their country. More recently it has been used as an insult for Welsh people who become part of the upper levels of the British establishment but forget their Welsh roots.

Ballad 
First and last verses of the ballad, on the left in 18th century Welsh and on the right an English translation.

Inclusion in other works 
The name is also mentioned in the anthem song, Yma o Hyd, 

There have been other poems written by other Welsh poets in the style of the Dic Siôn Dafydd ballad, including by Talhaiarn, published in 1862 under the title "Dammeg Dic Siôn Dafydd yr Ail" (The Parable of Dic Siôn Dafydd the Second).

There was also a "Englyn" competition (mode of Welsh poetry) in the 1824 Eisteddfod in Powys, where satirical poems were written under the title "Beddargraff Dic Siôn Dafydd" (The Epitaph of Dic Siôn Dafydd).

References 

Welsh culture
Welsh poetry
Quotations from literature
Fictional people from the 19th-century
Male characters in literature
Cultural assimilation
18th-century neologisms
Anti-English sentiment
Ethnic and religious slurs
Pejorative terms for European people
Cultural depictions of Welsh people